Iran competed at the 2012 Winter Youth Olympics in Innsbruck, Austria. Three athletes represented Iran in the 2012 Youth Olympics, two in alpine skiing and one in cross-country skiing. Yaghoub Kiashemshaki was the flagbearer for Iran in the opening ceremony.

Competitors

Results by event

Skiing

Alpine

Boys

Girls

Cross-country

Boys

References

Nations at the 2012 Winter Youth Olympics
Winter Youth Olympics
Iran at the Youth Olympics